Lawrence Thornton (born 1937) is an American novelist and critic living in Claremont, California. His most well known novel, Imagining Argentina, employs the methods of magic realism to tell a story of the Dirty War (1976-1983). This novel, along with Naming the Spirits and Tales from the Blue Archives, makes up the Argentina Trilogy. His work, published in eighteen languages, is frequently taught in schools and universities. In 2003 a film was made of Imagining Argentina by Christopher Hampton starring Antonio Banderas, Emma Thompson and Claire Bloom . In 1996, Zorongo Flamenco, a Minneapolis-based flamenco troupe, staged a flamenco version of the novel that featured an international cast of dancers and singers. In addition to writing six novels, he is the author of a non-fiction study of modern fiction, Unbodied Hope, as well as scholarly articles in PMLA, Comparative Literature, American Literature, Modern Fiction Studies and other learned journals. During the 1990s he was a regular reviewer for The New York Times Book Review.

Biography 
After graduating from high school, Thornton attended the University of California, Santa Barbara, earning a B.A. in 1960. He is the father of Shelley L. Thornton-Stauffer born 1963.

He returned for an M.A. in 1967 and began working with Hugh Kenner who directed his Ph.D. dissertation (1973). He met Toni Clark in 1966 and they married in 1969.  He taught at Montana State University from 1974 to 1984 when he left for a position at UCLA. After Imagining Argentina was published in 1987, he abandoned scholarship and concentrated solely on fiction. Since then, he has taught creative writing at UC Santa Barbara, UC Irvine, and Pomona College before retiring in 2009.

Awards 
 Gold Medal, Commonwealth Club of California 1996
 California Arts Council Artists' Fellowship 1993
 National Endowment for the Arts Fellowship 1989
 John Simon Guggenheim Fellowship 1988
 PEN/Hemingway Foundation Award 1987
 Silver Medal, Commonwealth Club of California 1987
 Finalist, PEN/Faulkner Award 1987
 PEN Center USA West Award for Best Novel of 1987
 Shirley Collier Award in Fiction UCLA 1987
 American Council of Learned Societies Grant 1984
 National Endowment for the Humanities Fellowship 1975, 1979, 1980

Works 
 Sailors on the Inward Sea, Free Press 2004
 Tales from the Blue Archives, Doubleday 1997
 Naming the Spirits, Doubleday 1995
 Ghost Woman, Ticknor & Fields 1992
 Under the Gypsy Moon, Doubleday 1990
 Imagining Argentina, Doubleday 1987
 Unbodied Hope: Narcissism and the Modern Novel, Bucknell University Press 1984

References 

20th-century American novelists
21st-century American novelists
American male novelists
Hemingway Foundation/PEN Award winners
University of California, Santa Barbara alumni
1937 births
Living people
PEN/Faulkner Award for Fiction winners
20th-century American male writers
21st-century American male writers
Pomona College faculty